The following is a list of Kannada films of the 1980s by year.

Kannada films of 1980
Kannada films of 1981
Kannada films of 1982
Kannada films of 1983
Kannada films of 1984
Kannada films of 1985
Kannada films of 1986
Kannada films of 1987
Kannada films of 1988
Kannada films of 1989

1980s
Kannada-language
Films, Kannada